JoNaLu is a 2008 German children's animated television series. The main characters are a male mouse named Jo, a female mouse named Naya and a male ladybug named  Ludwig (nicknamed Lu).

See also
List of German television series

External links
 

2008 German television series debuts
2010s German television series
German children's animated television series
German-language television shows